Lyons (also known as Lyon Station) is a borough in Berks County, Pennsylvania, United States. The population was 478 at the 2010 census.

History
Lyons was founded as Lyon Station in 1860 when the railroad was extended to that point. The community was named for Charles Lyons, a railroad official.

On May 31, 1998, an F3 tornado touched down in Lyons, causing roughly $1,400,000 worth of damage to local homes and properties. The town was closed off for nearly one month to all non-residents, save for construction teams and the Red Cross.

Geography
Lyons is located in eastern Berks County at  (40.480194, -75.756987). It is bordered by Maxatawny Township on its north, east, and south sides, and by Richmond Township to the southwest. The unincorporated community of Bowers borders the east side of Lyons.

Demographics

As of the census of 2000, there were 504 people, 203 households, and 133 families residing in the borough. The population density was 1,278.8 people per square mile (499.0/km2). There were 216 housing units at an average density of 548.1 per square mile (213.8/km2). The racial makeup of the borough was 97.62% White, 0.99% African American, 0.20% Asian, 0.20% from other races, and 0.99% from two or more races. Hispanic or Latino of any race were 1.19% of the population.

There were 203 households, out of which 28.6% had children under the age of 18 living with them, 47.3% were married couples living together, 13.3% had a female householder with no husband present, and 34.0% were non-families. 21.7% of all households were made up of individuals, and 4.4% had someone living alone who was 65 years of age or older. The average household size was 2.48 and the average family size was 2.81.

In the borough the population was spread out, with 21.6% under the age of 18, 16.9% from 18 to 24, 32.1% from 25 to 44, 18.7% from 45 to 64, and 10.7% who were 65 years of age or older. The median age was 33 years. For every 100 females there were 97.6 males. For every 100 females age 18 and over, there were 99.5 males.

The median income for a household in the borough was $40,500, and the median income for a family was $42,292. Males had a median income of $30,357 versus $25,875 for females. The per capita income for the borough was $20,459. About 3.2% of families and 8.9% of the population were below the poverty line, including 6.7% of those under age 18 and none of those age 65 or over.

Government
Lyons was served by the Berks-Lehigh Regional Police until it was disbanded on December 31, 2012. The borough is currently served by the Pennsylvania State Police.

Arts and culture

The Lyons Fire Company Social Club is a popular establishment for the locals. On top of the bartenders that serve the locals, the kitchen is open on Fridays and Saturdays, and runs weekly dinner specials. The Fire Company hosts its annual Fireman's Carnival the first weekend in August and also hosted Racefest, which brought a NASCAR driver to its grounds for the day. 

Lyons also hosts an annual Fiddle Festival every September where there is traditional Pennsylvania Dutch food, crafts, as well as dancing and fiddling contests. This is a large event hosting up to 1,000 people annually.

Lyons Ballfield is a softball ballfield associated with the Lyons Fire Company. It hosts many adult male and female fast-pitch softball games and PIAA high school softball games. The Kutztown Cougars and Brandywine Bullets have both used Lyons Ballfield as a home venue for some games. The ballfield is managed by Naaman Schlegel, a native of Lyons.

Transportation

No numbered highways pass through Lyons. The main thoroughfares through the borough include Main Street, Kemp Street, State Street and Penn Street.

References

External links

 
  Tornado History Project

Populated places established in 1700
Boroughs in Berks County, Pennsylvania
1927 establishments in Pennsylvania